Braggadocio is a geometrically constructed sans-serif stencil typeface designed by W.A. Woolley in 1930 for the Monotype Corporation. The design was based on Futura Black.

Though a stencil face, Braggadocio bears comparison with the heavier weighted Didone "fat face" fonts. A product of the Art Deco era, Braggadocio shares similarities with Architype Albers and Futura Black, the typeface used in the wordmark of Au Bon Pain, a U.S. restaurant-bakery chain.

The lowercase characters a, f, c, s and y have terminals similar to the Fat Face model. The face is atypical in that none of the characters has a circular hole.

See also
Stencil (typeface)
Samples of display typefaces

References

Jaspert, W. Pincus, W. Turner Berry and A.F. Johnson. The Encyclopædia of Type Faces. Blandford Press Lts.: 1953, 1983. .

External links
Braggadocio Font Family – by W. A. Woolley
 Truetype version of Braggadocio

Monotype typefaces
Geometric sans-serif typefaces
Display typefaces
Typefaces and fonts introduced in 1930